Gnezdino is a rural locality (a village) in Nagornoye Rural Settlement, Petushinsky District, Vladimir Oblast, Russia. The population was 1 as of 2010. There are 2 streets.

Geography 
Gnezdino is located 34 km west of Petushki (the district's administrative centre) by road. Kilekshino is the nearest rural locality.

References 

Rural localities in Petushinsky District